Morgan Walter Phillips (18 June 1902 – 15 January 1963) was a colliery worker and trade union activist who became the General Secretary of the British Labour Party, involved in two of the party's election victories.

Life
Born in Aberdare, Glamorgan, one of the six children of William Phillips, Phillips was brought up in Bargoed. He left school when he was 12 to become a colliery surface worker.

When he was 18, Phillips became a member of the Caerphilly divisional Labour Party, and served as secretary of the party in Bargoed, 1923–25. He was chairman of the Bargoed Steam Coal Lodge, 1924–26. He was able to attend the Labour College, London for a two-year course in economic and social subjects. He remained in London and became secretary of the Labour Party in West Fulham, 1928–30. and later in Whitechapel, 1934-37. He became a councillor on Fulham borough council, 1934–37.

In 1937 he was employed at the party's headquarters as propaganda officer, then as secretary of the party's research department from 1941. He soon rose to become secretary of the party in 1944, formally renamed general secretary in 1960. Phillips revolutionised the organisation of the Party and aimed to appeal to a wider set of people and professions, a professional basis for the election victories in 1945 and 1950, that saw fewer trade unionists and more professionals elected to Parliament. He called for recognition of middle class aspiration for wealth, home ownership and leisure opportunities, and warned against excessive emphasis on nationalisation. Nevertheless, Phillips and the party organization he led were blamed by some for the defeat in the 1955 general election: a post-mortem conducted by Harold Wilson labelled the party's organization as a "penny farthing [an antiquated model of bicycle] in a jet age".

In 1957, Phillips joined Aneurin Bevan and Richard Crossman in suing The Spectator magazine for libel. An article had been published by The Spectator  describing the men as drinking heavily during a socialist conference in Italy. Having sworn that the charges were untrue, the three collected damages from the magazine. Many years later, Crossman's posthumously published diaries confirmed the truth of the magazine's charges.

Phillips' reputation rose in the unsuccessful 1959 general election campaign. His daily press conferences were seen as an outstanding success, attracting much interest. He understood journalists and gave concise and insightful answers. He presented a clear analysis of what had happened during the election defeat and constructive proposals for the future, many of which are included in his paper, Labour in the Sixties (1960), that laid foundations for the return to power of the Labour Party in 1964. He also published East meets West (1954) and various political and economic pamphlets.

Phillips was a key figure in the international Labour movement and presided over several conferences of the International Socialist Committee from 1944 onwards. He served as chairman of the Socialist International from its formation in 1948 until 1957. He suffered a stroke in August 1960, at the height of his career, and retired as General Secretary in 1961, dying in early 1963.

Legacy
The Labour History Archive and Study Centre at the People's History Museum in Manchester has the General Secretary papers of Morgan Phillips in their collection.

Family
In Fulham Labour Party Phillips met Norah Lusher, later Baroness Phillips, whom he married in 1930. They had a son and a daughter. The latter, Gwyneth Dunwoody, was a long-serving Labour MP from 1964 until her death in 2008; she married John Dunwoody, who would also become a Labour Member of Parliament. Their daughter, Tamsin Dunwoody was a Member of the National Assembly for Wales from 2003 to 2007.

References

External links
 

1902 births
1963 deaths
British coal miners
Councillors in Greater London
People from Aberdare
People from Fulham
Presidents of the Socialist International
Welsh Labour politicians
Welsh miners
Welsh socialists
Spouses of life peers
Members of Fulham Metropolitan Borough Council
People from Bargoed